Brent Dearmon (born December 19, 1984) is an American football coach who is currently the head coach at the University of North Alabama. He was previously the offensive coordinator and quarterbacks coach at the University of Kansas, Middle Tennessee State University, and Florida Atlantic University. Dearmon was also the head coach at Bethel University in Tennessee, where he won a Mid-South Conference championship in his lone season there. He also played college football at Bethel, where he set career and single-season records in passing yards and touchdowns. Dearmon spent time playing professionally for indoor football teams before getting into coaching.

Coaching career 
Dearmon began his coaching career as a student assistant at his alma mater Bethel in 2007 working with the defensive backs. He was hired to be the offensive coordinator at his high school alma mater Vigor High School in Alabama, while also working at the school as a math teacher. He was named the head coach at B. C. Rain High School in Mobile in 2011, where he compiled a 5–15 record in his two seasons there before accepting an off the field coaching role at Auburn. He was a part of a trio of high school football coaches hired as analysts at Auburn in 2013 under first-year head coach Gus Malzahn. He left Auburn in 2014 to accept the offensive coordinator position at Arkansas Tech.

Bethel (second stint) 
Dearmon was named the head coach at his alma mater Bethel in 2018. In his lone season as the program's head coach, he compiled a 10–1 record and won a Mid-South conference championship.

Kansas 
Dearmon left Bethel in 2019 to accept a senior offensive analyst position at Kansas under Les Miles. He was promoted to offensive coordinator and quarterbacks coach midway through the season after Les Koenning was fired.

Middle Tennessee State 
Dearmon was named the offensive coordinator and quarterbacks coach at Middle Tennessee in 2021.

North Alabama 
He was announced as the head coach for the University of North Alabama on December 3, 2022.

Head coaching record

College

References

External links
 
 Middle Tennessee profile

1984 births
Living people
American football quarterbacks
Arkansas Tech Wonder Boys football coaches
Auburn Tigers football coaches
Bethel Wildcats football coaches
Bethel Wildcats football players
Evansville BlueCats players
Kansas Jayhawks football coaches
Middle Tennessee Blue Raiders football coaches
North Alabama Lions football coaches
San Angelo Stampede Express players
Tennessee Valley Vipers players
High school football coaches in Alabama
Sportspeople from Mobile, Alabama
Coaches of American football from Alabama
Players of American football from Alabama